Duddleswell is a village in the Wealden district, East Sussex in England, United Kingdom.

Villages in East Sussex
Maresfield